Yelizavetovka may refer to:

 Yelizavetovka, a village in the Vorobyovsky District in the Voronezh Oblast, Russia
 Yelizavetovka, a village in the Pavlovsky District in the Voronezh Oblast, Russia
 Yelizavetovka, a village in the Kursk Oblast, Russia